Lakhtar railway station is a  railway station on the Western Railway network in the state of Gujarat, India. Lakhtar railway station is 21 km far away from Surendranagar railway station. Two Passenger, two Express, and one Superfast trains halt here.

Nearby stations 

Bajrangpura is the nearest railway station towards , whereas Kesariya Road is the nearest railway station towards  .

Trains 

Following Express and Superfast trains halt at Lakhtar railway station in both direction:

 19217/18 Saurashtra Janata Express
 22945/46 Saurashtra Mail
 19570 Veraval–Mumbai Central Express

See also
 Surendranagar district

References

Surendranagar district
Rajkot railway division
Surendranagar